The USC Marshall School of Business is the business school of the University of Southern California. It is accredited by the Association to Advance Collegiate Schools of Business.

In 1997 the school was renamed following a $35 million donation from alumnus Gordon S. Marshall.

History
The Marshall School began as the College of Commerce and Business Administration in 1920. The Graduate School of Business Administration was established in 1960. The Entrepreneurship Program, the first of its kind in the United States, was established in 1972 and is internationally recognized. It has now been renamed The Lloyd Greif Center for Entrepreneurial Studies. The Pacific RIM Education (PRIME) program was implemented in 1997 as the first ever MBA course of its kind to require all first year full-time MBA students to participate in an international experience.

The Leventhal School of Accounting was formed within the school on February 7, 1979. All of its classes are offered at the University Park campus in Los Angeles.

James G. Ellis was the dean from 2007 through June 30, 2019. The interim dean is Gareth James, the E. Morgan Stanley Chair in Business Administration, director of the Institute for Outlier Research in Business, and Professor of Data Sciences and Operations, who has held a number of roles in his more than 20 years at Marshall.

On June 11, 2019, it was announced that Geoffrey Garrett would be leaving the Wharton School of the University of Pennsylvania at the end of the 2019-2020 academic year to become dean of the Marshall School of Business. Garrett will begin his tenure as dean of Marshall in July 2020.

Campus
The school occupies five multi-story buildings on campus: Hoffman Hall (HOH), Bridge Hall (BRI), the Accounting building (ACC), Popovich Hall (JKP) and Jill and Frank Fertitta Hall (JFF), which houses the Marshall School's undergraduate programs.

Popovich Hall
This is the main building of the Marshall School's MBA programs. The $20 million,  building opened in 1999 as one of the most technologically advanced business school buildings in the United States. It was named after alumni J. Kristofer Popovich and Jane Hoffman Popovich for their $5 million gift.

Bridge Hall
Bridge Hall (built in 1928) housed all undergraduate offices for the Marshall School of Business until the opening of Jill & Frank Fertitta Hall in the fall of 2016. Fertitta Hall, a 104,000-square-foot, five-story building, was built expressly for Marshall's undergraduate community. It houses USC Marshall's Undergraduate student services, admissions and advisors' offices. The Office of the Dean, staff offices and a few classrooms continue to be housed at Bridge Hall.

Hoffman Hall

The H. Leslie Hoffman Hall of Business Administration, which opened in 1973 and stands eight stories tall, is the former home of the Crocker Business Library (now renamed the Gaughan & Tiberti Library on the first floor of Fertitta Hall). It is named for H. Leslie Hoffman, father of Jane Hoffman Popovich. It was designed by architect I.M. Pei. The building was extensively renovated in 2015-16 into faculty offices.

Programs

Undergraduate
The Marshall School offers a Bachelor of Science in Business Administration. There are several joint programs that offer studies with International Relations and Cinematic Arts in combination with Business Administration. New students take a business core and have other time to fulfill the USC Core and take elective classes.

The undergraduate program offers a variety of international opportunities. The Global Leadership Program (GLP) comprises a two-semester seminar on business leadership in China and a spring break trip to China.

Graduate
Marshall's two-year full-time MBA comprises a straightforward intensive core and a diverse range of electives and concentrations.

USC Marshall also offers an MBA program for Professionals and Managers (MBA-PM), an online MBA (OMBA), an executive MBA (EMBA) and a one-year international MBA (IBEAR).

The School offers 11 specialty master's degrees, offering specialized business education on a number of topics, including finance, business analytics, marketing, social entrepreneurship and global supply chain management.

Executive Education

For individuals, Marshall Executive Education offers open enrollment programming with business certificate programs – online and in-person – geared towards professional and personal development.

Ph.D
Ranked within the top 15 world business research institutions, the Marshall School offers a full-time doctoral program within the five academic departments. The program generally lasts 4–5 years with up to two years of dissertation. Along working with notable faculty, doctoral students also receive substantial financial aid, such as graduate assistantship and a living stipend, during their study.

Trojan Family
The Marshall School has more than 82,000 alumni worldwide in 123 countries. Events at Marshall often emphasize the importance of networking within the Trojan Family.

Rankings
2023 QS Business Masters Rankings

 Masters in Supply Chain Management - 5th in the world.
 Masters in Business Analytics - 9th in the world.
 Masters in Marketing - 16th in the world.
 Masters in Finance - 29th in the world.

2022 Poets and Quants

 Undergraduate Program is 3rd in the US
 Online MBA program No. 1 in the US.

People

Notable alumni

Dan Bane (B.S. '69) Chairman and CEO of Trader Joe's
Marc Benioff (B.S. '86) Founder and CEO of Salesforce.com
John Campbell (M.B.T. '77) United States Congressman
Henry Caruso (B.S.) Founder of Dollar Rent-A-Car
Alan Casden (B.S. '68) Chairman and CEO of Casden Properties
Ronnie Chan (M.B.A) Chairman of Hang Lung Group and Hang Lung Properties in Hong Kong
Yang Ho Cho (M.B.A. '79) President and CEO of Korean Airlines and Chairman of the Hanjin Group
Chris DeWolfe (M.B.A. '97) Co-founder and CEO of MySpace
Vic Edelbrock, Jr. (B.S. '59) President and CEO of Edelbrock Automotive
Charles Elachi (M.B.A. '78) Director of the Jet Propulsion Laboratory (JPL)
Frank Fertitta III (B.S. '84) CEO of Station Casinos
Robert M. Fomon (B.S. '51) Former Chairman and CEO of E. F. Hutton & Co. and governor of the New York Stock Exchange
Pat Gillick (B.S. '58) General manager of the Philadelphia Phillies
Ivan Glasenberg (M.B.A. '83) CEO of Glencore
Henry C. Gordon (M.B.A. '66) X-20 Dyna-Soar astronaut
Chris R. Hansen (M.B.A. '96) Founder of Valiant Capital Management
Dean Heller (B.S. '85) United States Senator
Tom Hicks (M.B.A. '70) Businessman and owner of English soccer team Liverpool F.C.
Bradley Wayne Hughes (B.S. '57) Founder and CEO of Public Storage
Jon Huntsman, Sr. (M.B.A.) Founder and Chairman of Huntsman Corporation; benefactor of the Huntsman School of Business
Hyekyung "Shelly" Hwang (M.B.A.) Co-founder of Pinkberry
Rob Kardashian (B.S. 2009) TV reality star
Richard Knerr (B.S. '47) Co-founder and former president of Wham-O
Lenny Krayzelburg (B.S. '98) Olympic gold medalist
Terrence Lanni (B.S. '65) Chairman and CEO of MGM Mirage
J. Sterling Livingston (B.S. '38) Author, management consultant and former professor at the Harvard Business School
Paul Locatelli (Ph.D '71) President and professor of accounting at Santa Clara University
Armen Margarian (B.S. 2001, M.B.A. 2006) - Co-Founder and CEO of NexusLab Inc. (an Inc.5000 Company)
Preston Martin (B.S. '47, M.B.A. '48) Founder of the PMI Mortgage Insurance Company; former Vice Chairman of the Federal Reserve Board
Steve McIntosh (B.S. '84) Founder and president of Now & Zen, Inc.; an influential writer in the field of integral theory
Anthony Muñoz (B.S. '76) Former National Football League Offensive Lineman
Pat Nixon (B.S. '37) Former First Lady
Paul Orfalea (M.B.A. '71) Founder of Kinko's and benefactor of the Orfalea College of Business
Mark Prior (B.S. '04) Major League Baseball pitcher
Edward P. Roski (B.S. '62) Chairman and CEO of Majestic Realty Co., part owner of the Los Angeles Kings and Los Angeles Lakers
Steve Saleen (B.S.) Founder and CEO of Saleen Performance, Inc.
Michele Tafoya (M.B.A. '91) ESPN sportscaster
Brian Teacher (born 1954), tennis player
Kevin Tsujihara (B.S. '86) CEO of Warner Bros.
Ronald N. Tutor (B.S. '63) Chairman and CEO of Tutor Perini Corporation 	
Ben Wanger (M.S. '20), American-Israeli Olympian, baseball pitcher, Team Israel
Chelsea Zhang, (B.S. '17) actress
Masagos Zulkifli (M.B.A. '95) Minister, Ministry of the Environment and Water Resources, Singapore

Faculty
Richard B. Chase – Justin Dart Professorship in Operations Management
Thomas W. Gilligan – E. Morgan Stanley Chair in Business Administration
William Holder – Ernst & Young Professorship in Accounting
Lloyd Levitin – Professor of Finance
Kenneth Merchant – Deloitte & Touche LLP Chair in Accountancy
Ian Mitroff – Harold Quinton Distinguished Chair in Business Policy and Professor of Management and Organization
Kevin J. Murphy – Kenneth L. Trefftzs Chair in Finance
Kirk Snyder - Assistant Professor of Clinical Management Communication; expert on LGBT issues.
Gerard Tellis – Jerry and Nancy Neely Chair in American Enterprise
S. Mark Young – KPMG Foundation Professorship in Accounting, Marshall School of Business.

See also
Economics
Glossary of economics
List of United States business school rankings
List of business schools in the United States

References

Business schools in California
Business
Educational institutions established in 1920
1920 establishments in California